Hatar may refer to:
Hatar, Iran
Hatar, Pakistan
Határ, Romania